Nothomastix obliquifascialis is a moth in the family Crambidae. It was described by George Hampson in 1896. It is found in Myanmar.

References

Moths described in 1896
Spilomelinae